was a Japanese photographer.

References

Japanese photographers
1937 births
2003 deaths